Tavar ( may refer to:
 Tavar, Lorestan (تاور - Tāvar)
 Tavar, Mazandaran (توار - Tavār)
 Tavar, North Khorasan (توار - Tavār)